Al Misrakh District is a district of the Taiz Governorate, Yemen. As of 2003, the district had a population of 112,653 inhabitants.

Location 

It is located in the middle part of Taiz governorate. It is bordered by Mashra'a Wa Hadnan to the north, Sabir Al Mawadim to the east, Sabir Al Mawadim and Al Ma'afer to the west, Same'a to the south.

Uzaal and villages of Al Misrakh district 
Rural districts in Yemen are divided into 'Uzaal while Uzaal are divided into villages. There are twelve Uzaal in Al Misrakh district.

'Arsh
Al-Aqrud
Anbiyān
Hasban A'la
Hasban Asfal
Jarah
Khurishah
Masfar
Sanamat
Taluq
Watir
Abdan

References

 
Districts of Taiz Governorate